Opuntia chaffeyi is a species of plant in the family Cactaceae. It is endemic to Zacatecas state in Mexico.  Its natural habitat is hot deserts. It is a Critically endangered species, threatened by habitat loss.

References

chaffeyi
Cacti of Mexico
Endemic flora of Mexico
Flora of Zacatecas
Critically endangered biota of Mexico
Critically endangered flora of North America
Taxonomy articles created by Polbot